Martha Lupe Moyano Delgado (born October 14, 1964) is a Peruvian nurse, Fujimorist politician and a Congresswoman representing Lima for the 2021–2026 term, previously serving in the 2000–2001, 2001–2006, and 2006-2011 terms. Moyano belongs to the Alliance for the Future party. She is the sister of María Elena Moyano, who was assassinated by Shining Path. She is the first Afro-Peruvian woman to serve as President of Congress.

Early life and education 
Moyano was born in Callao on October 14, 1964. She is the daughter of Hermógenes Moyano Lescano and Eugenia Delgado Cabrera. Her sister was María Elena Moyano, a Peruvian activist who was shot and dynamited by the Shining Path terrorist group in Villa El Salvador.

She completed her early school studies at Colegio 6069 Pachacútec in Villa El Salvador.

She began her technical studies in nursing, at the Andrés Belaúnde Study Center, in 1978, and finished in 1981. In 2010, she began studying law at Telesup University.

Political career 
Her political career began in the municipal elections of 1995, where she was a candidate as councilor of Lima for Cambio 90 - Nueva Mayoría. However, she was not elected.

She ran for mayor of Villa El Salvador, in the municipal elections of 1998, for Vamos Vecino, again without success.

First Congressional Career 
In the 2000 general elections, Moyano was elected congresswoman of the republic by the Peru 2000 alliance, with 25,802 votes, for the 2000–2005 parliamentary term.

In November 2000, her parliamentary position was reduced until 2001 after the publication of electoral fraud and Alberto Fujimori's resignation from the presidency of the republic, by fax from Japan. In the same year, new general elections were called for 2001, where Moyano tried his re-election to Congress, by Cambio 90 - Nueva Mayoría, without success.

In August 2001, after Congresswoman Carmen Lozada was removed from office for acts of corruption, Moyano was summoned by Congress to hold the position. She was sworn in as an assistant congresswoman for the 2001-2006 parliamentary term.

In the 2006 general elections, she was again elected congresswoman for Alianza por el Futuro, with 9,938 votes, for the 2006-2011 parliamentary period.

During her parliamentary work, she was the second vice president of Congress in the board of directors chaired by Luis Gonzales Posada (2007-2008).  Between 2009 and 2011, she fulfilled her work as a congresswoman in the different work commissions of the Congress of the Republic, such as: Decentralization, Constitution, Housing and Lifting of Immunity.

Completing her legislative work, Moyano again attempted her re-election to Congress in the 2011 general elections by Fuerza 2011 led by Keiko Fujimori. However, she was not reelected.

Alderman of Lima 
In the municipal elections of 2018, Moyano was elected alderman of Lima, by Fuerza Popular, for the municipal period 2019–2022.

She resigned in 2020 to run as a candidate for Congress in the 2021 elections.

Second Congressional Career 
In the 2021 general elections, Moyano was again elected congresswoman of the republic by Fuerza Popular, with 23,262 votes, for the 2021-2026 parliamentary term. From 8 to 12 of September 2022, she served as the interim president of Peruvian Congress.

Controversies

Conviction for defamation 
On January 22, 2019, she was sentenced to two years in prison for the crime of aggravated defamation with the sentence suspended. She accused Jenny Romero Coro, in 2017, of being a participant in the murder of María Elena Moyano. She was sentenced in the first instance, but, after the appeal, the sentence was dismissed.

References

External links

Official Congressional Site

Living people
Fujimorista politicians
1964 births
Members of the Congress of the Republic of Peru
Women members of the Congress of the Republic of Peru